Tiger is a 2007 Bengali Vigilante film directed by Swapan Saha. The film featured Mithun Chakraborty and Debashree Roy in lead role. This movie released on 11 October 2007. It is the remake of Tamil film Ramanaa stars Vijaykanth in lead role.

Synopsis
The film deals with the journey of  a professor along with his ex-students, against corruption. Professor Indrajeet Sen, a grief-stricken professor of Rammohan College Kolkata vows to end corruption among the government officials, after his wife and son are killed in a building collapse. Will he be able to accomplish his mission with the help of his ex-students, who are employed at various government offices?

Cast
 Mithun Chakraborty as Professor Indrajeet Sen a.k.a. Tiger
 Debashree Roy as Suparna Sen,  Indrajeet's wife.
 Rajatava Dutta as  Bikram Sinha, a corrupt businessman.
 Dulal Lahiri as Constable Banabihari Das
 Sumit Ganguly as Bablu, Bikram Sinha's henchman
 George Baker as CBI officer Arjun Roy (Special Appearance)
 Mrinal Mukherjee as Public Prosecutor Prakash Chowdhury
 Bharat Kaul as lawyer
 Sudip Mukherjee as police officer
 Mrityun Hazra  as Jailor Shekhar

Music

Subhayu Bedajna  and Jeet Gannguli composed the music for Tiger.

Release

The film released on 11 October 2007. It was a critical and a commercial success. The film was rated 3.5 out of 5 stars.

References

External links
 

2007 films
Bengali remakes of Tamil films
Films scored by Jeet Ganguly
Indian vigilante films
Films about corruption in India
Films about social issues in India
Indian courtroom films
Bengali-language Indian films
2000s Bengali-language films
Films directed by Swapan Saha